Yvonne Blanche Louise Degraine (7 October 1899 – 26 April 1985) was a French swimmer. She competed at the 1920 Summer Olympics in the 100 m freestyle event, but failed to reach the final. She was married to Olympic cyclist Lucien Faucheux, but the marriage did not last.

References

1899 births
1985 deaths
French female freestyle swimmers
Swimmers at the 1920 Summer Olympics
Olympic swimmers of France
Swimmers from Paris
20th-century French women